Alexei Bolshakov may refer to:

 Aleksei Bolshakov (born 1966), Russian footballer
 Alexei Bolshakov (politician) (1939–2017), Russian politician